Central Kitsap High School  is a secondary school located in Silverdale, Washington, United States. It is one of seven secondary schools in the Central Kitsap School District. CKHS teaches grades 09-12. CKHS was for the first time ranked in the top 2% of the nation academically in 2002 and has continued to be through the 2015–2016 school year. CKHS has also garnered two Washington Achievement Awards for closing the Achievement Gap, and has also appeared regularly in the U.S. News & World Report as a nationally ranked school (Data complications with the move to adding ninth graders in 2014–2015 have led to an erroneous omission for the 2016 list).

In 2014–2015, CKHS became a four-year high school, serving grades 9-12 as part of a district reconfiguration movement. Beginning in school year 2016–2017, CKHS began competing in the South Sound Conference with seven other 3A schools. In the fall of 2017, the groundbreaking ceremony for the new CKHS and Central Kitsap Middle School building was held. CKHS moved to the new building over the summer of 2019, with classes beginning in the new building in the fall of 2019.

Demographics
In the 2013–2014 school year, 54% of the students at CKHS are male and 46% of the students are female, 0.4% are Native American, 6.8% are Asian, 0.9% are Native Hawaiian/Other Pacific Islander, 7.7% are Asian/Pacific Islander, 9.5% are Hispanic, 2.6% are Black, and 64% are White.

The teacher-to-student ratio is approximately 1:17. In 2012, Central Kitsap High School was named in the top 9% of high schools in America by US News, academically, in math and reading.

Notable alumni
 Kevin Bond Allen, bishop in the Anglican Church in North America (ACNA).
 Michelle Downey Caldier, Washington State House Representative 26th District, Position 2
 Mike Herrera, vocalist and bass guitarist for the band MxPx
 Bryan Hinkle, former Linebacker for the Pittsburgh Steelers 
 Troy Kelly, American professional golfer who plays on the PGA Tour.
 Todd Linden, former MLB outfielder for the San Francisco Giants
 Steve Okoniewski, former NFL defensive end
 Joe Sullivan, former MLB pitcher

References

External links
CKHS webpage
OSPI School Report Card 2010-2011
2020-2021 Annual School Performance Report

High schools in Kitsap County, Washington
Educational institutions established in 1924
Public high schools in Washington (state)
1924 establishments in Washington (state)